Zafarullah is a male Muslim given name, meaning victory of God. it may refer to

Muhammad Zafarullah Khan (1893–1985), Pakistani diplomat
Zafrullah Chowdhury (born 1941), Bangladeshi public health activist
Zafarullah Khan Jamali (1944–2020), Prime Minister of Pakistan
Muhammad Zafarullah, Pakistani university vice-chancellor

Arabic masculine given names